Gerald Chick (born c. 1965) is a Canadian-Australian curler and curling coach. He is originally from Winnipeg. As of 1996, he was living in Melbourne. He moved to Australia in 1990, and joined the Australian team as their coach, until he was eligible to curl for the country in 1992.

At the international level, he is a five-time  curler (1992, 1993, 1994, 1995, 1996).

Awards and honours
Manitoba Sports Hall of Fame: 2016 (with other teammates from "Team Ursel", who won ).

Teams and events

Men's

Mixed

Mixed doubles

Record as a coach of national teams

References

External links

Living people
Australian male curlers
Pacific-Asian curling champions
Australian curling champions
Canadian male curlers
Australian curling coaches
1960s births
Canadian emigrants to Australia
Curlers from Ontario
Curlers from Winnipeg
Sportspeople from Melbourne